Blood Brothers is a musical with book, lyrics, and music by Willy Russell. The story is a contemporary nature versus nurture plot, revolving around fraternal twins Mickey and Eddie, who were separated at birth, one subsequently being raised in a wealthy family, the other in a poor family. The different environments take the twins to opposite ends of the social spectrum, one becoming a councillor, and the other unemployed and in prison. They both fall in love with the same girl, causing a rift in their friendship and leading to the tragic death of both brothers. Russell says that his work was based on a one-act play that he read as a child "about two babies switched at birth ... it became the seed for Blood Brothers."

Originally developed as a school play, Blood Brothers debuted in Liverpool before Russell transferred it to the West End for a short run in 1983. The musical won the Laurence Olivier Award for Best New Musical and went on to a year-long national tour before returning for a revival in the West End in 1988 where it stayed at the Albery Theatre for 3 years, transferring to the Phoenix Theatre in 1991. The revival ran for more than 24 years in the West End, and played more than 10,000 performances, becoming the third longest-running musical production in West End history. It finally closed in November 2012. The musical has been produced with success on tour, on Broadway and elsewhere, and it has developed a cult following.

Production history

Original production
Willy Russell originally wrote and presented Blood Brothers as a school play first performed at Fazakerley Comprehensive School, Liverpool, in November 1981, in conjunction with Merseyside Young People's Theatre (MYPT; now operating as Fuse: New Theatre For Young People). He then wrote a score and developed the musical for a production at the Liverpool Playhouse, opening on 8th January 1983, starring Barbara Dickson (Mrs. Johnstone), Andrew Schofield (narrator), George Costigan (Mickey) and Andrew C. Wadsworth (Eddie). It was only a modest success. Nevertheless, the show transferred to London's West End on 11 April 1983 at the Lyric Theatre and ran until 22 October 1983, winning the Olivier Award for Best New Musical and another Olivier for Dickson's performance. This was followed by a 1984 UK tour.

1988–2012 West End
Blood Brothers 
year-long national tour beginning in 1987, produced by Bill Kenwright (and directed by Kenwright and Bob Tomson), starring Kiki Dee as Mrs Johnstone, Warwick Evans as the Narrator, Con O'Neill as Mickey and Robert Locke as Eddie, leading to a revival at the Albery Theatre (now the Noël Coward Theatre), directed by Tomson, with the same cast. O'Neill won an Olivier Award for his performance, and Dee was nominated. It opened on 28 July 1988 and moved out of that theatre on 16 November 1991. The musical transferred to the Phoenix Theatre on 21 November 1991, where it celebrated its 10th Anniversary with a gala performance on 28 July 1998, featuring Lyn Paul as Mrs Johnstone, Keith Burns (Narrator) Andy Snowden (Mickey) & Mark Hutchinson (Eddie). The show closed its West End run on 10 November 2012. Due to close on 27 October, its run was extended by 2 weeks with returning favourites in the closing cast, including Lyn Paul, original narrator Warwick Evans, Sean Jones as Mickey, Mark Michael Hutchinson as Eddie and Jan Graveson as Linda.  It played more than 10,000 performances in London, making it the third longest-running musical to ever play in the West End. The UK tour continued until 2013.

The central role of Mrs. Johnstone has been played in various productions by, among others, Dee, Angela Richards, Barbara Dickson, Stephanie Lawrence, Debbie McGee, Clodagh Rodgers, Lyn Paul, Jane Rossington, Siobhan McCarthy, four of the Nolan sisters (Linda, Bernie, Denise and Maureen), Anneka Rice, Melanie C (making her West End debut and receiving an Olivier nomination in 2009), Marti Webb, Vivienne Carlyle, Niki Evans, Amy Robbins, Natasha Hamilton, Helen Reddy, Rebecca Storm, Carole King and Petula Clark. Stephanie Lawrence played the role more times than anyone else. Mickey has been played by O'Neill, Russell Boulter, Stephen McGann, Paul Crosby, Antony Costa, Stefan Dennis, Andy Snowden, David Cassidy and Michael J.Cook among others. Notable actors to play Eddie include Hutchinson and Shaun Cassidy. Narrators include Evans, Carl Wayne, Adrian Zmed, David Soul and Marti Pellow. Alex Harland played the small role of the postman in more than 4,000 performances.

Australia
The inaugural Australian production of Blood Brothers premiered August 1988 at the York Theatre in Sydney where it ran for three months: the cast included Chrissy Amphlett as Mrs Johnstone, Bob Baines as the Narrator, Zoe Carides as Linda, Peter Cousens as Edward and Russell Crowe as Mickey. 

In 1994 a production of Blood Brothers directed by Bill Kenwright - who had overseen the play in the West End and on Broadway - ran in Melbourne and Sydney in the summer and fall having played dates in Wellington and Auckland NZ that spring: the cast included Stefan Dennis as Mickey, Delia Hannah as Mrs. Johnstone, and David Soul as the Narrator.

In 2013 Blood Brothers was produced by the Harvest Rain Theatre Company of Brisbane playing the Cremorne Theatre 3–17 August: directed by Tim O'Connor, the production featured Amanda Muggleton in the role of Mrs. Johnstone. Muggleton had previously played Mrs. Johnstone in the Metcalfe Playhouse (Perth) production of Blood Brothers which ran 11 November – 4 December 2011.

The Chapel Off Chapel venue in Prahran hosted a production of Blood Brothers from 19 March – 6 April 2014: the cast included Chelsea Plumley as Mrs.Johnstone and Peter Hardy and Glenda Linscott as the Lyons.

In 2015 Enda Markey revived Blood Brothers for a 6 February – 15 March engagement at Hayes Theatre Co, reportedly affording the play its first professional production in Sydney since the September 1994 engagement of the play's New Zealand/Australian tour. The play was produced by Enda Markey and directed by Andrew Pole with musical direction by Michael Tyack: the cast included Blake Bowden as Edward, Michael Cormick as the Narrator, Helen Dallimore as Mrs Johnstone, and Bobby Fox as Mickey. The production went on to play for three weeks at the Alex Theatre, St Kilda, Melbourne, from 14 July 2015, with Josh Piterman taking over the role of Edward.

Broadway and U.S. tour
The Broadway production opened on 25 April 1993 at the Music Box Theatre and closed on 30 April 1995 after 840 performances. It was co-directed by Tomson and Kenwright. Several of the British actors made their Broadway debuts, including Stephanie Lawrence as Mrs. Johnstone, O'Neill as Mickey, Graveson as Linda, Hutchinson as Eddie and Evans as the narrator. Barbara Walsh was Mrs Lyons, and Kerry Butler made her Broadway debut in the ensemble. To boost box office sales during the run, Kenwright persuaded Petula Clark to make her Broadway debut, replacing Lawrence as Mrs. Johnstone, with David Cassidy and Shaun Cassidy as her sons. The casting of the Cassidy half-brothers as the twins generated much publicity. The musical received Tony Award nominations for best musical, best book and best direction, and Lawrence (best actress), O'Neill (best actor) and Graveson (best featured actress) were all nominated for their performances in the original Broadway production. Following Clark's portrayal, Mrs. Johnstone was played by other 1970s pop singers, with King and Reddy later playing the role on Broadway.

Clark and David Cassidy also starred in the US national tour from 1994 to 1995. Clark and the Cassidys also recorded the international cast album, with the musical’s playwright, Willy Russell as the Narrator. Many of the cast members were also in the Canadian run, which starred David Cassidy, Michael Burgess and Canadian singer-songwriter Amy Sky.

South African adaptation
David Kramer adapted and directed the South African version in 2012, which he set in District Six, a predominantly Coloured inner-city residential area in Cape Town during the Apartheid era, with black cast members. This was the first time that Willy Russell had allowed the musical to be adapted.

Pokrvní bratia (Slovak)
"Pokrvní bratia" - "Blood Brothers", adapted in the Czech-Slovak language - has been produced several times in the Czech Republic and Slovakia, the inaugural production - adapted into Czech-Slovak by Alexandra Ruppeldtová - premiering in December 1993 at the Nová Scéna Theatre in Bratislava and featuring Soňa Valentová in the role of Johnstonová [i.e. Mrs Johnstone]. The premiere Prague engagement of "Pokrvní bratia" - introducing an adaptation by Adam Novák - inaugurated its  run 17 November 2004: this production would feature  and Sisa Sklovská alternating in the role of Johnstonová. "Pokrvní bratia" -  as adapted by Fahner - was produced by the Liberec-based  whose engagement premiered 23 March 2007: this production would encore in September 2008 as the inaugural production of the Heineken Tower Stage at Tower 115 in Bratislava, where the F. X. Šalda troupe performed "Pokrvní bratia" over three nights. Brno City Theatre revived the Novák adaptation for a production which premiered 2 June 2012 for a 25 performance run during which Hana Holišová and  alternated in the role of Johnstonová.

Other international productions
In addition to the above, the musical has also been produced in various theatres in Europe, Argentina, Mexico, Japan, Korea and Canada.

Plot

Act One
The play opens in the early 1980s, at the ending of the story. Mrs. Johnstone, surrounded by others including Mr. and Mrs. Lyons, and the Narrator, is standing over the bodies of Mickey and Eddie and sings “Tell Me It’s Not True” (“Overture”). The Narrator introduces the “story of the Johnstone twins” to the audience and the play then goes back in time to the late 1950s, at the start of the story.

Some time in the late 1950s, Mrs Johnstone, who by now is 25 years old, is living in the Victorian inner city slums of Liverpool. She describes her whirlwind romance with her husband, who, once attracted to her because of how she looked like Marilyn Monroe, lost interest in her after multiple pregnancies and weight gain and eventually left her for a younger, more attractive woman. She also reveals that she is once again pregnant ("Marilyn Monroe"). Heavily in debt and unable to support her seven children alone ('by the time that I was twenty-five, I looked like forty-two. With seven hungry mouths to feed and one more nearly due'), she takes a job as a cleaner for a local upper middle-class couple, Mr. Richard Lyons and Mrs. Jennifer Lyons. Soon she finds out she is pregnant with twins, but can only afford to raise one more child.

Mrs. Lyons is desperate for a baby but is unable to conceive, and would like to adopt a child but her husband, who is away on business overseas, is not keen on the idea. Mrs. Johnstone reveals to Mrs Lyons that she is going to have twins and explains that she cannot afford to raise two more babies. Mrs. Lyons then suggests that Mrs. Johnstone gives one of the babies to her ("My Child"). Mrs. Johnstone apprehensively agrees to this and is made to swear on the Bible to keep to the deal. Mrs. Johnstone has the twins, and names the two children Michael (known as Mickey throughout the play) and Edward, but then regrets having agreed to give one away ("Easy Terms"). After keeping her deal with Mrs. Lyons, she lies to her older children, saying that the other baby had died and gone to heaven.
 	
Mrs. Johnstone continues to work for the Lyons family, but Mrs. Lyons soon feels that Mrs. Johnstone is paying too much attention to the child that she has given up to her. In the early 1960s, she fires Mrs. Johnstone because of this, however in return Mrs. Johnstone wants to take the baby with her. Mrs. Lyons offers her money which Mrs. Johnstone refuses but Mrs. Lyons plays on Mrs. Johnstone's superstitious nature by telling her that "if twins separated at birth learn that they were once one of a pair they will both immediately die" ("Shoes Upon the Table"). Mrs. Lyons again gives Mrs. Johnstone the money and leaves. It is implied that Mrs. Johnstone is left traumatised by this encounter.
 	
In the late 1960s, a seven-year-old Mickey, the son of Mrs. Johnstone, meets Edward, the other twin, by chance, and after learning they share the same birthday, the two boys make a pact to become blood brothers, with Mickey calling Edward "Eddie". Mrs. Johnstone finds them, and fearing that they will find out they are twins, sends Eddie away, telling him not to come round again or else the "Bogey-man" will get him. Later in the day, Mickey goes to Eddie's house, but Mrs. Lyons throws him out when she comes to the realisation that he is Edward's separated twin. She and Eddie argue on the subject, and Eddie swears at her. Mrs. Lyons slaps him, blaming Mickey for teaching him inappropriate language, and immediately regrets her reaction. She realises that he has learned to swear from Mickey.
 	
Mickey plays with some neighbourhood children including his friend Linda ("Kids' Game"), where Mickey says a swear word and is bullied by other children, including his nine-year-old older brother Sammy, a notorious troublemaker in the area and a leader of the other children, for doing so, stating that he will go to hell. Linda defends Mickey and reassures him, revealing the closeness of the two. Afterwards, Mickey takes her to see Eddie, and the three of them sneak off to play. Mrs. Lyons worries about Eddie's whereabouts. ("Gypsies in the Wood") The three are caught by a police officer when about to throw stones through a window and taken home to their respective parents. Mrs. Lyons, worried about Eddie's friendship with Mickey, decides to move and persuades her husband, who believes her paranoia to be illness and agrees to the move. Eddie goes to Mrs. Johnstone's house to say goodbye to Mickey and she gives him a locket which she claims to contain a picture of herself and Mickey, though it is suggested that it may have contained a picture of herself and Eddie instead. Edward asks Mrs. Johnstone why she doesn't simply move away, causing her to dream about the seemingly impossible possibility of her moving away and beginning a new life ("Bright New Day (Preview)").
 	
After Eddie has moved away, Mickey tries to visit Eddie but finds him not home, and asks the new tenant of the house where he has moved to no avail. Without Eddie he feels alone. ("Long Sunday Afternoon / My Friend")
 	
Soon afterwards, in the early 1970s, the Johnstone family are rehoused from the condemned inner city slum area of Liverpool to a new council house in the nearby overspill town of Skelmersdale ("Bright New Day"). This reflected the gradual demolition of the city’s slum clearances and the relocation to families on new housing estates in Liverpool and nearby towns around this period.

Act Two
Act Two rejoins the twins when they are 14 years old, some time in the mid-1970s (often believed to be 1974). The Johnstone family are enjoying a better life now they have moved to a new home and a new area, and they have not seen Eddie in all this time ("Marilyn Monroe 2"). Mickey has now developed a crush on Linda, who is obviously interested in him too, but Mickey does not know how to approach her and is embarrassed by her honesty to being attracted to him. During their journey to school Sammy, Mickey’s older brother, pretends to be 14 to get a cheaper bus ticket. When he is confronted his violent nature becomes obvious; he swears violently at the driver, threatens him with a knife, steals some money and escapes. 

Eddie is suspended from his boarding school for refusing to give up his locket to a teacher. Meanwhile, Mickey refuses to pay attention or co-operate during a class in his school, insulting the teacher, and is suspended. Linda is also suspended for defending him. When he returns home, Eddie refuses to tell Mrs. Lyons about the locket’s contents, and when she takes it and sees the picture inside she panics, and immediately assumes it is a picture of Eddie. She grows paranoid, having once thought she had buried the past by moving away, and questions Mrs. Johnstone's presence in their life ("The Devil's Got Your Number"). Eddie and Mickey, now teenage and insecure, both reminisce over their blood brother, and after seeing each other but not realising they are seeing their blood brother, think about how they wish they had the qualities the other guy has ("That Guy"). After Mickey and Linda walk through a field in the countryside surrounding Skelmersdale, where Linda expresses her frustration at how Mickey has not yet asked her out, Mickey and Eddie meet by chance once again, revealing that the Lyons family moved close to Skelmersdale (where the Johnstone family now live) and they discover that they live close to each other. Eddie gives Mickey humorously inexperienced advice on how to talk to Linda, and invites him to see a pornographic film with him to "see how it's done". 

An increasingly mentally deranged and paranoid Mrs. Lyons further questions whether she is truly free from Mrs. Johnstone ("Shoes Upon The Table (Reprise)") as Mickey asks his mother for money to see a film while reintroducing Eddie. After she realises it is a pornographic film, the three have a humorous moment, before Mrs. Johnstone gives them the money and they leave. Mrs Lyons, by this point in the play clearly mentally ill, discovers Mrs Johnstone's house and confronts her, believing that she followed her after they moved. After she admits that she “never made him [Eddie] mine”, she offers to pay off Mrs. Johnstone again. After Mrs. Johnstone stands her ground and declares she will not be paid off again, stating that she has made a good living for herself out of her new life, an enraged Mrs. Lyons attempts to attack Mrs. Johnstone with a knife, but a now strong-willed Mrs. Johnstone fights back and kicks her out, with Mrs. Lyons fleeing in terror. Mrs. Lyons continues to deteriorate into insanity and it is implied that she has now become known for being mentally insane. (Mad Woman On A Hill).

Mickey, Eddie and Linda spend each summer as teens together, taking the play to the end of the 1970s, when an 18-year-old Eddie reveals to Linda that he is leaving for university in Liverpool the following day, but has not told her or Mickey. Linda reveals Mickey still hasn't asked her out, prompting Eddie to tell her what he would say to her if he were Mickey. Secretly, he is revealing his true feelings but has not acted on then out of respect for Mickey ("I'm Not Saying A Word"). Eddie leaves for university in Liverpool, but not before encouraging Mickey to ask Linda out. 

During Eddie's absence, in the early 1980s, Linda becomes pregnant, she and Mickey soon quickly marry and move in with Mrs Johnstone. Mickey is then made redundant from his factory job due to the recession ongoing at the time, which hits Merseyside particularly hard, which forces Mickey onto the dole shortly before Christmas (“Take A Letter Miss Jones"). Eddie returns at Christmas ready to party and have fun, but Mickey realises that they are now very different; after a small argument with Eddie, they part. Mickey is persuaded to assist his brother Sammy, who now engages in criminal acts, in a robbery, to earn money to support Linda and their baby daughter Sarah. The robbery goes wrong, and he becomes an accessory to a murder committed by Sammy. He is sentenced to seven years in prison but the incident destroys Mickey mentally.

In prison, Mickey is diagnosed as chronically depressed. When released early for good behaviour, he is still dependent on anti-depressants. He becomes withdrawn and turns away from Linda ("Marilyn Monroe 3"). Linda, unable to get Mickey off the anti-depressants, contacts Eddie, who is now a local councillor, and he gets them their own house in Liverpool and Mickey a job ("Light Romance"), taking the focus of the play back to Liverpool. Linda worries about Mickey and continues to meet up with Eddie. A mentally insane Mrs. Lyons, now seemingly willing to get back at Mrs. Johnstone in any way possible, even if it involves possibly being harmful to Eddie, sees them together and tells Mickey about it, suggesting that the two are having an affair. Mickey, distraught over Eddie and Linda's 'affair,' grabs the gun that Sammy hid before he got arrested and then storms down to the council offices to confront Eddie ("Madman").

There, Eddie is giving a speech when Mickey storms in with the gun. Mickey asks why Eddie would take away the one good thing that Mickey had – Linda. Eddie denies this intention, and the police enter, demanding that Mickey put the gun down. After being informed by Linda of the incident, Mrs. Johnstone runs in and, in an attempt to stop Mickey from shooting Eddie, tells the two brothers the truth. Mickey furiously despairs that he was not the one given away, because then he could have had the life given to Eddie. Mickey, enraged and violently angry, gestures with the gun towards Eddie. The gun goes off, killing Eddie, with the police then shooting and killing Mickey. 

Mrs. Lyons' superstitious prediction has come true, and the narrator questions whether class was more to blame than superstition. ("Tell Me It's Not True").

Alternative Ending 
In another version, Mickey has a fake gun. Mrs. Johnstone rushes to stop him and reveals the truth, which provokes Mrs. Lyons to attempt to shoot Mickey in order to keep her own child. Eddie jumps in and takes the bullet, and Mrs. Lyons shoots Mickey in rage. This version ends with the narrator’s monologue.

So did you ever hear the tale of the Johnston twins

As like each other two new pins,How one was kept, one given awayThey were born and they died on the self same day.Notable casts and characters

 Casts 

 Characters 
The Narrator, who throughout the play breaks the fourth wall to help the story progress and act as a moral compass. He also plays other characters at various points, including: Policeman, Milkman, Judge, Finance Man, Catalogue Man and Bus Conductor.
Mrs Johnstone, the Lyons' cleaner who single-handedly supports her seven (later eight) children.
Mrs Jennifer Lyons, the employer of Mrs Johnstone. Mrs Lyons convinces Mrs Johnstone to give her one of her twin sons to raise as her own.
Edward 'Eddie' Lyons, Mickey's twin brother who was given away by Mrs Johnstone, and brought up by Mrs Lyons; he becomes blood brothers with Mickey (his actual brother).
Michael 'Mickey' Johnstone, the youngest Johnstone child who is kept by his mother; he becomes blood brothers with Eddie (his actual brother).
Sammy Johnstone, the elder brother of Mickey, who fell out of a window as a child resulting in having a metal plate in his head and commits many crimes
Linda, a childhood friend of Mickey and Eddie and later Mickey's wife.
Mr Richard Lyons, Mrs Lyons's husband, who is unaware of Edward's true parentage.
Miss Jones, Mr Lyons's secretary, who, after initially firing all of the workers, is fired from the firm herself as a result of the 1970s recession.
Donna Marie Johnstone, one of the elder Johnstone children, who was looking after Sammy when they were little and he fell out of a window; by Act II, she is married with three children.
Darren Wayne Johnstone, the eldest Johnstone child.

Musical numbers

 Act I
 Overture – Orchestra, Company and Narrator
 "Marilyn Monroe" – Mrs. Johnstone and Full Company
 "Marilyn Monroe" (Reprise) – Mrs. Johnstone
 "My Child" – Mrs. Johnstone and Mrs. Lyons
 "Easy Terms" – Mrs. Johnstone
 "Shoes Upon the Table" – Narrator
 "Easy Terms" (Reprise) – Mrs. Johnstone
 "Kids' Game" – Linda, Mickey and Ensemble
"Gypsies in the Wood" (Reprise of Shoes Upon the Table) - Narrator
 "Bright New Day" (Preview) – Mrs. Johnstone
 "Long Sunday Afternoon" / "My Friend" – Mickey and Eddie
 "Bright New Day" – Mrs. Johnstone and Full Company

 Act II
 Entr'acte – Orchestral piece
 "Marilyn Monroe 2" – Mrs. Johnstone and Full Company
 "The Devil's Got Your Number" – Narrator
 "That Guy" – Mickey and Eddie
 "Shoes Upon the Table" (Reprise) – Narrator
 "I'm Not Saying a Word" – Eddie
 "Miss Jones" – Mr Lyons, Miss Jones and Full Company
 "Marilyn Monroe 3" – Mrs. Johnstone
 "Light Romance" – Mrs. Johnstone
 "Madman" – Narrator
 "Tell Me It's Not True" – Mrs. Johnstone and Full Company

Recordings
1983 Original London Cast Recording
1988 London Cast Recording
1995 Australian Cast Recording
1995 London Cast Recording
1995 International Cast Recording

Awards and nominations

Original London production

1988 London revival

Original Broadway production

 See also 

 Long-running musical theatre productions

 References 

External links
kenwright.com Official website

Interview with Lyn Paul, who plays Mrs Johnston, Liverpool Daily Post'', 28 December 2007

1983 musicals
Plays set in the 1950s
Plays set in the 1960s
Plays set in the 1970s
Plays set in the 1980s
Plays set in Liverpool
Liverpool in fiction
Musicals based on works by Alexandre Dumas
Broadway musicals
West End musicals
Original musicals
Laurence Olivier Award-winning musicals
Plays by Willy Russell
British musicals
Twins in fiction